Olga Yakovleva (born 15 December 1963) is a Russian former basketball player who competed in the 1988 Summer Olympics.

References

1963 births
Living people
Russian women's basketball players
Olympic basketball players of the Soviet Union
Basketball players at the 1988 Summer Olympics
Olympic bronze medalists for the Soviet Union
Olympic medalists in basketball
Soviet women's basketball players
Medalists at the 1988 Summer Olympics